The 2003 United Nations Security Council election was held on 23 October 2003 at United Nations Headquarters in New York City during the 58th session of the United Nations General Assembly. The General Assembly elected five non-permanent members of the UN Security Council for two-year terms commencing on 1 January 2004.

The five candidates elected were Algeria, Benin, Brazil, Philippines, and Romania.

Geographic distribution
In accordance with the General Assembly's rules for the geographic distribution of the non-permanent members of the Security Council, and established practice, the members were to be elected as follows: two from Africa, one from Asia, one from Eastern Europe, and one from Latin American and the Caribbean.

Candidates
There were only five declared candidates for the five seats available. Thus they easily obtained the required 2/3 majority in the General Assembly.

Results
Voting proceeded by secret ballot. For each geographic group, each member state could vote for as many candidates as were to be elected. There were 182 ballots in each of the three elections. Two member states were not given ballot papers because they were in arrears of their UN member contributions.

Group A — African and Asian States (three to be elected)
Benin 181
Philippines 179
Algeria 178
Republic of Korea 1

Group B — Eastern European States (one to be elected)
Romania 174
Poland 1
abstentions 7

Group C — Latin American and Caribbean States (one to be elected)
Brazil 177
Argentina 1
abstentions 4

See also
List of members of the United Nations Security Council
Brazil and the United Nations
Philippines and the United Nations

References
UN Document GA/10181 press release

2003 elections
2003
2003 in international relations
Non-partisan elections
October 2003 events